Irandankattalai is a village in the Kumbakonam taluk of Thanjavur district, Tamil Nadu, India.

Demographics 

As per the 2001 census, Irandankattalai had a total population of 874 with 413 males and 461 females. The sex ratio was 1113. The literacy rate was 76.37.

References 

 

Villages in Thanjavur district